The 2014–15 Czech First League, known as the Synot liga for sponsorship reasons, was the 22nd season of the Czech Republic's top-tier football league and the first since it was renamed from the Gambrinus liga to the Synot liga due to a change in sponsor. The season started on 25 July 2014 and ran until the end of May 2015, with a winter break between November and February. Fixtures for the season were announced on 25 June 2014. The winners were FC Viktoria Plzeň, while the previous season's champions Sparta Prague finished in second place.

Teams

Stadia and locations

Personnel and kits

Managerial changes

League table

Results

Top scorers

See also
 2014–15 Czech Cup
 2014–15 Czech National Football League

References

External links
  

2014–15 in European association football leagues
1
2014-15